The 2021–22 Rutgers Scarlet Knights men's basketball team represented Rutgers University–New Brunswick during the 2021–22 NCAA Division I men's basketball season. The Scarlet Knights were led by sixth-year head coach Steve Pikiell and played their home games at Jersey Mike's Arena in Piscataway, New Jersey as members of the Big Ten Conference. They finished the season 18–14, 12–8 in Big Ten play to finish a three-way tie for fourth place. As the No. 4 seed in the Big Ten tournament, they lost in the quarterfinals to Iowa. The Knights received an at-large bid to the NCAA tournament for the second consecutive year as a No. 11 seed in the West region. There they lost in the First Four to Notre Dame in double overtime.

Previous season
In a season limited due to the ongoing COVID-19 pandemic, the Knights finished the 2020–21 season 16–12, 10–10 in Big Ten play to finish in a tie for sixth place. As the No. 7 seed in the Big Ten tournament, they defeated Indiana in the second round before losing to Illinois in the quarterfinals. They received an at-large bid to the NCAA tournament, their first NCAA Tournament appearance since 1991. As the No. 10 seed in the Midwest region, they defeated Clemson in the first round before losing to Houston in the second round.

Offseason

Departures

Incoming transfers

Recruiting classes

2021 recruiting class

2022 Recruiting class

Roster

Schedule and results

On December 9, Rutgers upset then-top-ranked Purdue, 70–68, at home, as Ron Harper Jr. hit a buzzer-beating three-pointer from near mid-court as time expired to down the Boilermakers. It was the first time in program history that the Scarlet Knights had ever beaten a #1-ranked team.

|-
!colspan=12 style=|Regular season

|-
!colspan=12 style=|Big Ten tournament

|-
!colspan=9 style=|NCAA tournament

Source

Rankings

Coaches did not release a Week 1 poll.

References

Rutgers Scarlet Knights men's basketball seasons
Rutgers
Rutgers
Rutgers
Rutgers